The Süper Lig (Super League), officially known as Spor Toto Süper Lig for sponsorship reasons, is a Turkish professional league for association football clubs. It is the top-flight of the Turkish football league system and is run by the Turkish Football Federation. In the 2022–23 season, nineteen clubs compete, where a champion is decided and three clubs are promoted from, and relegated to the 1. Lig. The season runs from August to May, with each club playing 36 matches. Matches are played Friday through Monday.

The competition was initially established in 1923. The league succeeded the Turkish Football Championship and the National Division, both being former top-level national competitions. The Süper Lig is currently 20th in the UEFA coefficient ranking of leagues based on club performances in European competitions over the last five years. A total of 73 clubs have competed in the Süper Lig, but only six have won the title to date: Galatasaray (22), Fenerbahçe (19), Beşiktaş (16), Trabzonspor (7), İstanbul Başakşehir (1) and Bursaspor (1).

History
Football in Turkey stems back to the late 19th century, when Englishmen brought the game with them while living in Salonica (then part of the Ottoman Empire). The first league competition was the Istanbul Football League, which took place in the 1904–05 season. The league went through several variations until the creation of the Millî Lig (Süper Lig) in 1959. Between the creation of the Istanbul League and Millî Lig, several other regional leagues took place: Adana (1924), Ankara (1922), Eskişehir (1924), İzmir (1924), Bursa (1924), and Trabzon (1922), to name a few. The first competition to bring forth a national champion was the former Turkish Football Championship, which began in 1924 and continued until 1951. The championship format was based on a knockout competition, contested between the winners of each of the country's top regional leagues. The National Division (Turkish: Millî Küme) was the first national league competition in Turkey. Started in 1937, the National Division consisted of the strongest clubs from the Ankara, Istanbul, and İzmir leagues. The championship lasted until 1950.

The Federation Cup was established in 1956 to decide a national champion. This champion would go on to participate in the European Cup. The competition was held for two seasons until it was replaced by the Millî Lig. Beşiktaş won both editions and qualified for the European Cup during the two-year span. However, since the TFF failed to register their name for the draw in time, Beşiktaş could not participate in the 1957–58 season after all.

The top clubs of Ankara, Istanbul, and İzmir competed in the 1959 Turkish National League. The first season took place in the calendar year of 1959, instead of 1958-59, since the qualifying stages took place in 1958. The 16 clubs who competed in the first season were: Adalet (Istanbul), Altay (İzmir), Ankaragücü (Ankara), Ankara Demirspor (Ankara), Beşiktaş (Istanbul), Beykoz (Istanbul), Karagümrük (Istanbul), Fenerbahçe (Istanbul), Galatasaray (Istanbul), Gençlerbirliği (Ankara), Göztepe (İzmir), Hacettepe Gençlik (Ankara), İstanbulspor, İzmirspor, Karşıyaka (İzmir), and Vefa (Istanbul). The first champions were Fenerbahçe and the first "Gol Kralı" (top scorer) was Metin Oktay. No clubs were promoted or relegated at the end of the first season.
 
The 2. Lig (Second League) was created at the start of the 1963–64 season and the Millî Lig became known as the 1.Lig (First League). Before the foundation of a second division, the bottom three clubs competed with regional league winners in a competition called the Baraj Games. The top three teams of the group were promoted to the Süper Lig. After the foundation of a new second division in 2001, known as the 1. Lig, the formerly titled 1. Lig was rebranded as Süper Lig. The Süper Lig is home of the Fenerbahçe–Galatasaray derby, the most watched football game in Turkey. It is considered to be one of the best and most intense in the world, being ranked among the greatest football rivalries of all-time by various international sources.

Competition format 

There has been 18 clubs in the Süper Lig until 2020. 20 Clubs are competing in the Süper Lig starting from 2020. During the course of the season (from August to May) each club plays the others twice (a double round robin system), once at their home stadium and once at that of their opponents, for a total of 38 games. Teams receive three points for a win and one point for a draw. No points are awarded for a loss. Teams are ranked by total points, then head-to-head record, then goal difference, and then goals scored. At the end of each season, the club with the most points is crowned champion. If points are equal, the head-to-head record and then goal difference determine the winner. The three lowest placed teams are relegated to the 1. Lig and the top two teams from the 1. Lig, together with the winner of play-offs involving the third to sixth placed 1. Lig clubs are promoted in their place.

Qualification for European competitions 
Qualification for European competitions is as follows: champions qualify for the group stage of the Champions League, runners-up qualify for the second qualifying round of the Champions League, third place qualifies for the third qualifying round of the Europa League, and fourth place qualifies for the second qualifying round of the same competition. A fifth spot is given to the winner of the Turkish Cup, who qualify for the play-off round of the Europa League. If the Turkish Cup winner has already qualified for European competition through their league finish, the next highest placed club in the league takes their place.

UEFA ranking

Clubs 

a

Champions 
Only six clubs have been champions since the introduction of the Super League: Galatasaray 22 times, Fenerbahçe 19 times, Beşiktaş 16 times (see note below), Trabzonspor 7 times, and Bursaspor and İstanbul Başakşehir once each.

Teams in bold compete in the Super Lig as of the 2022–23 season.

1 Beşiktaş formally requested that championships won in the 1956–57 and 1957–58 editions of the Turkish Federation Cup be counted as Turkish Professional First Division championships to the Turkish Football Federation. The Cup was established in 1956 to find a national champion to represent Turkey, after UEFA decided that only national champions could participate in the European Cup. Beşiktaş had therefore earned the right to represent Turkey in the European Cup in the 1957–58 and 1958–59 seasons. The ruling on this matter was announced in a press release on March 25, 2002 which indicated that the championships won by Beşiktaş in the Federation Cup would be counted as national league championships.

Star rating system
The honor of Golden Stars was introduced in football to recognize sides that have won multiple championships or other honours by the display of gold stars on their team badges and jerseys.
In Turkey, clubs are permitted to place a golden star above their crest for every five national championships won. As of the 2020-21 season Galatasaray are permitted four golden stars, Fenerbahçe and Beşiktaş are permitted three golden stars, and Trabzonspor are permitted one golden star to be placed above their crest on their jerseys.

League participation 
As of 2022, 74 clubs have participated.
Note: The tallies below include up to the 2022–23 season. Teams denoted in bold are current participants.

 65 seasons: Beşiktaş, Fenerbahçe, Galatasaray
 53 seasons: MKE Ankaragücü
 50 seasons: Bursaspor
 49 seasons: Trabzonspor
 48 seasons: Gençlerbirliği
 42 seasons: Altay
 31 seasons: Gaziantepspor
 30 seasons: Eskişehirspor, Göztepe, Samsunspor
 27 seasons: Antalyaspor
 24 seasons: İstanbulspor
 22 seasons: Adanaspor, Konyaspor
 21 seasons: Çaykur Rizespor, Denizlispor
 20 seasons: Boluspor, Kocaelispor
 19 seasons: Adana Demirspor, Kasımpaşa
 18 seasons: Kayserispor
 17 seasons: Sivasspor
 16 seasons: Karşıyaka
 15 seasons: İstanbul Başakşehir, Mersin İdmanyurdu
 14 seasons: Vefa, Zonguldakspor
 13 seasons: Ankara Demirspor, Kayseri Erciyesspor, Sarıyer
 12 seasons: PTT
 11 seasons: Diyarbakırspor, Malatyaspor, Orduspor, Sakaryaspor
 10 seasons: Altınordu, İzmirspor, Kardemir Karabükspor, Şekerspor
 9 seasons: Ankaraspor, Fatih Karagümrük, Feriköy
 8 seasons: Beykozspor, Giresunspor, Hacettepe Gençlik 
 7 seasons: Akhisarspor, Alanyaspor
 6 seasons: Manisaspor
 5 seasons: Vanspor, Yeni Malatyaspor,  Zeytinburnuspor
 4 seasons: Elazığspor, Gaziantep FK
 3 seasons: Aydınspor, Bakırköyspor, Çanakkale Dardanelspor, Erzurumspor, Hatayspor
 2 seasons: Adalet, Akçaabat Sebatspor, Balıkesirspor, Beyoğluspor, Erzurumspor F.K., Hacettepe, Yeşildirek, Yozgatspor
 1 season: Bucaspor, Kahramanmaraşspor, MKE Kırıkkalespor, Petrolofisi, Siirtspor, Ümraniyespor

Player records

Most goals

As of 15 May 2021

Most appearances

As of 15 May 2021

 Bold denotes players still active in the league.
 All players are Turkish unless otherwise indicated.

Turkish football clubs in UEFA competitions

‡ Galatasaray was one of the final eight teams of the 1993–94 UEFA Champions League group stage, however UEFA does not consider this a quarter-final participation.

Official match ball 
 2008–2010: Nike T90 Omni
 2010–2011: Nike T90 Tracer
 2011–2012: Nike Seitiro
 2012–2013: Nike Maxim
 2013–2014: Nike Incyte
 2014–2015: Nike Ordem 2
 2015–2016: Nike Ordem 3
 2016–2017: Nike Ordem 4
 2017–2018: Nike Ordem 5
 2018–2020: Nike Merlin
 2020–2021: Adidas Uniforia
 2021–2022: Adidas Conext 21 Pro
 2022-present: Puma Orbita

See also
Turkish Football Championship
Turkish National Division
List of foreign Süper Lig players
List of Süper Lig top scorers
List of Turkish football champions
Turkish Super League all-time table

References and notes

External links 

Süper Lig official website 
Turkish Football Federation website 

 
Turk
1959 establishments in Turkey
Sports leagues established in 1959
1
Football
Professional sports leagues in Turkey